Spacehog are an English rock band formed in 1994 in New York City. Their music is heavily influenced by David Bowie, Queen, and T. Rex. The band's best-known single is "In the Meantime".

History
Though all the band members are from Leeds, West Yorkshire, Spacehog was formed in New York City. Antony Langdon met Jonny Cragg by chance in a café where Cragg had a job killing rats. Soon after, Langdon's brother Royston joined the band, and Spacehog was born. The band's original guitarist, Robert Curreri, was asked to leave the band, and Cragg's Canadian friend Richard Steel replaced him in 1994. The band signed in 1994 with Seymour Stein to Sire Records.

On 24 October 1995, Spacehog released its first album, Resident Alien. It went gold on the Billboard charts, selling over 500,000 copies and spawned the hit single and video "In the Meantime" as well as the single "Cruel To Be Kind". "In the Meantime" received heavy video and radio play, and was used as background music to BBC's Match of the Day football programme. The band performed the song on Channel 4's TFI Friday in 1996. The band's second album, The Chinese Album, was released on 10 March 1998. Though it did not sell as well as Resident Alien, the band's popularity continued to increase as Spacehog opened for more popular acts such as Pearl Jam and Supergrass. The Chinese Album had a more "artsy" sound, with the Pink Floyd-like piano on the opening track and Michael Stipe of R.E.M. contributing vocals to the song "Almond Kisses".

After the band was dropped by Elektra Records, Spacehog signed with the upstart label Artemis Records and released its third album, The Hogyssey, on 10 April 2001. The album continued the band's neo-glam approach and included the singles "I Want to Live" and "At Least I Got Laid", as well as a funk version of Richard Strauss's "Also sprach Zarathustra". The band joined The Black Crowes and Oasis on the Tour of Brotherly Love in support of the album, which proved to be the band's final major tour for several years.

Royston Langdon and American actress Liv Tyler became engaged in February 2001, and married in Barbados on 25 March 2003. In December 2004, she gave birth to their son, Milo William Langdon. On 8 May 2008, the couple confirmed through representatives that they would be separating but remain friends.

Arckid

Antony, Royston, and Christian Langdon then pooled their resources to form Arckid. By June 2006, they had recorded eight songs with Bryce Goggin at Trout Studios in Brooklyn. Jonny Cragg, now sporting a moustache, joined The Twenty-Twos as their drummer post-Spacehog, but has since rejoined the Langdon brothers in Arckid.

At the end of November 2006, Antony Langdon left Arckid on good terms and had devised an alter ego known as "Louis Arogant". This project was near completion as a record entitled Victoria: an homage to Langdon's love for his wife, the director Victoria Clay de Mendoza. The album was intended to release at end of 2007, but was never released. He also continued in the production of his television work. Also in the works was an album by Antony Langdon and Joaquin Phoenix. The project was called This Lady is a Tramp and was being mixed by Paul McKenna with help from Creation Records founder Alan McGee and the Charlatans’ Tim Burgess.

Antony Langdon was briefly replaced in Arckid by Your Vegas guitarist Mat Steel, who subsequently left Arckid after they shot their first video to rejoin Your Vegas. Pete Denton of Cube and Kid Symphony fame joined Arckid for a short period of time. Richard Steel accompanied the three members of Arckid on stage during the Hilfiger Sessions NY and the 2007 Lollapalooza gigs.

Reunion
In July 2008, Spacehog reunited to play two shows, the first at the Viper Room and the second at Troubador. Drummer Jonny Cragg posted on the Arckid MySpace page that Spacehog would be reuniting and would begin work on a new record. In July 2009, Spacehog reunited at Spaceland in Los Angeles.

I'm Still Here
In 2010, Spacehog guitarist Antony Langdon gained notoriety for his role in the controversial mockumentary I'm Still Here, starring Joaquin Phoenix. Langdon, who was one of Phoenix's assistants as well as a musical partner, staged a falling-out with the actor during the documentary's filming and is shown defecating on the troubled actor in retaliation for an earlier argument. In an earlier part of the film, there is a similarly shocking scene involving Langdon getting out of the shower.

Langdon's time in Spacehog is not mentioned in the film, but a clip of the band performing on television is shown. Royston Langdon is also credited for one of the film's songs.

The film's cinematographer, Magdalena Gorka, sued director Casey Affleck for multiple complaints. She alleged Antony Langdon, who worked as the camera assistant, was one of the crew members who subjected her to "routine instances" of sexual harassment.

As It Is on Earth
On 17 September 2011, Spacehog announced the completion of their latest album, As It Is on Earth, on their MySpace page. It was released on 16 April 2013.

Members
Royston Langdon a.k.a. "Ray Sprinkles" (born Royston William Langdon, 1 May 1972) – bass and vocals
 Antony Langdon a.k.a. "Tone Down" (born Antony Alfred Chester Langdon, 14 May 1968) – rhythm guitar and vocals
 Jonny Cragg a.k.a. "Corky"  (born 18 July 1966) – drums
 Richard Steel a.k.a. "Rich" (born 12 November 1968) – lead guitar

Discography

Studio albums

EPs
Hamsters of Rock (Sire, 1996)
4 Future Tracks (Artemis, 2001)

Singles

References

External links
 (Archived)

Musical groups established in 1994
Musical groups disestablished in 2002
Musical groups reestablished in 2008
English glam rock groups
Musical quartets
Sire Records artists
Alternative rock groups from Leeds